The 1987 Metro Conference men's basketball tournament was held March 6–8 at Freedom Hall in Louisville, Kentucky. 

 defeated Louisville in the championship game, 75–52, to win their fourth Metro men's basketball tournament.

Due to sanctions, the Tigers were ineligible to participate in the NCAA Tournament. No other conference teams received at-large bids, leaving the Metro Conference out of the 1987 NCAA Tournament.

Format
All seven of the conference's members participated. They were seeded based on regular season conference records, with the top team earning a bye into the semifinal round. The other six teams entered into the preliminary first round.

Bracket

References

Metro Conference men's basketball tournament
Tournament
Metro Conference men's basketball tournament
Metro Conference men's basketball tournament